Vance DeBar Colvig Sr. (September 11, 1892 – October 3, 1967), known professionally as Pinto Colvig, was an American voice actor, cartoonist, and circus and vaudeville performer whose schtick was playing the clarinet off-key while mugging. Colvig was the original performer of the Disney characters Goofy and Pluto, as well as Bozo the Clown. In 1993, he was posthumously made a Disney Legend for his contributions to Walt Disney Films, including Snow White and the Seven Dwarfs and Fun and Fancy Free.

Early life 
Colvig was born Vance DeBar Colvig in Jacksonville, Oregon, one of seven children of William Mason "Judge" Colvig (1845–1936) and his wife, Adelaide ( Birdseye) Colvig (1856–1912). 

William Colvig was a pioneer, an attorney and a distinguished Oregonian, he was never actually a judge. Pinto attended but did not graduate from Medford High School. Pinto was accepted and attended, sporadically from 1910 to 1913, Oregon State University, in Corvallis, where he took art classes and played clarinet in the band. He drew cartoons for the Oregon Agricultural College Barometer newspaper, and the yearbook.

I was born in Jacksonville and named Vance DeBar Colvig. At age 7 (because of too many freckles, and goony antics) I was nicknamed 'Pinto the Village Clown' (which I have used professionally during my circus and other show business activities, besides occasional jobs as a newspaper cartoonist.— "'Pinto' Colvig Writes About Names, History of Clowning", Medford Mail Tribune, July 12, 1961.

Career 

In 1913, Colvig worked the Pantages Theatre Circuit, briefly, before leaving for clarinetist in the Al G. Barnes Circus band for part of a season. In 1914 he was a newspaper cartoonist in Reno, Nevada and then in Carson City, then again clarinetist in the Al G. Barnes Circus band for part of the 1915 season.

I didn't know when I was going to school whether I wanted to be a clown, draw cartoons, write, hobo, or be a musician. So I wrapped it all up and made stew out of it. — Pinto Colvig

Colvig performed chalk talks in vaudeville.

In 1916, Pinto Colvig worked at the Animated Film Corporation in San Francisco with Byington Ford and Benjamin Thackston Knight (1895–1977), aka "Tack" Knight at the Animated Film Corporation, a company which produced animated cartoons years before Walt Disney. The company produced animated cartoons several years before Walt Disney did and was the oldest known studio of its kind established in the West Coast. That year Colvig at Animated Film Corporation produced "Creation," reported to be the world's first feature-length cartoon. Only five 35 mm frames survive, housed at the Southern Oregon Historical Society.

In 1919, Pinto produced "Pinto's Prizma Comedy Review," the first color cartoon, it is now considered a lost film, and published in the San Francisco Bulletin (May 1919—February 1920), the "Bulletin Boob" column, and photographs.

In 1922, Colvig created a newspaper cartoon panel titled "Life on the Radio Wave" for the San Francisco Chronicle. The feature ran three or four times per week on the newspaper's radio page, was syndicated nationally, and lasted six months. In 1922, Colvig and his family moved to Hollywood, working as an animator, title writer, and comedian in silent comedies and on sound cartoons, working first for Mack Sennett.

By the late 1920s, Colvig became associated with Walter Lantz, with whom he attempted to establish a cartoon studio, creating a character called "Bolivar, the Talking Ostrich", which would have appeared in sound shorts. When Lantz became producer of Universal's Oswald the Lucky Rabbit cartoons in 1929, Colvig was hired as an animator, also working as a storyman and voice artist, briefly voicing Oswald.

In 1930, Colvig signed an eight-year contract with Walt Disney Productions as a writer, also providing sound effects, including the barks for Pluto the Pup. The following year he began voicing Goofy, originally known as Dippy Dawg. Other notable characters he voiced include Practical Pig, the pig that built the "house of bricks" in the Disney short "Three Little Pigs", and both Sleepy (originally to be voiced by Sterling Holloway) and Grumpy in Snow White and the Seven Dwarfs. He also provided Ichabod Crane's screams in The Adventures of Ichabod and Mr. Toad in 1949. He directed (along with Erdman Penner and Walt Pfeiffer) the 1937 Mickey Mouse short Mickey's Amateurs. Colvig would be associated with Disney for most of his career.

Between 1937 and 1940, Colvig did not work for the Disney studio, after falling out with Walt  Disney. He was offered a job with Fleischer Studios, then planning to produce a competing feature-length animation film in the wake of Disney's success with Snow White and the Seven Dwarfs, moving to Miami in early 1938. For Fleischer, he worked on 1939's Gulliver's Travels, for which he voiced town crier Gabby, who was spun off into his own short-lived series. He also voiced Bluto for the studio's Popeye the Sailor cartoons, replacing Gus Wickie, who had decided to stay in New York rather than move to Miami. Colvig's departure from Disney meant that the increasingly popular Goofy went voiceless for a number of years. A select few shorts during the interim period of leave featured a soundalike voice for Goofy provided by impersonator Danny Webb, who also did the voice of Egghead in Looney Tunes. He began working on radio, providing voices and sound effects, including the sounds of Jack Benny's Maxwell on The Jack Benny Program, later performed by Mel Blanc.

In 1939, Colvig returned to California, and began to devote himself to acting, appearing for the Warner Bros. animation studio and MGM, where he voiced a Munchkin in the 1939 film The Wizard of Oz.

In 1946, Colvig was cast as Bozo the Clown for Capitol Records. He played the role for a full decade, which also included portraying the character on television. During this period, Colvig also recorded the "Filbert the Frog" song, which featured Colvig's virtuoso use of the glottal stop as a musical instrument in itself.

In 1967, Colvig's last known performance, as Goofy, was for the Telephone Pavilion at Expo 67. Colvig's dialogue for this exhibit was recorded six months before his death.

Personal life 
Colvig married Margaret Bourke Slavin (1892–1950) in 1916, and settled with her in San Francisco, where four of their five boys were born; later, their last son was born in Los Angeles.

Colvig was the father of the character and voice actor Vance Colvig, who also later portrayed Bozo the Clown on a live TV program.

A lifelong smoker, Colvig was one of the pioneers in advocating warning labels about cancer risk on cigarette packages in the United States.

Death

Colvig died of lung cancer on October 3, 1967, at Motion Picture Country Hospital in Woodland Hills, California, at age 75. He was interred at Holy Cross Cemetery in Culver City.

Filmography

Discography 
Bozo At The Circus (Capitol, 1946) as Bozo the Clown
Mickey and the Beanstalk (Capitol, 1947) as Goofy
Here Comes...Colonna's Trolley (Capitol, 1947) as Additional Voice Characterizations
Bozo and his Rocket Ship (Capitol, 1948) as Bozo the Clown
Bozo Under The Sea (Capitol, 1948) as Bozo the Clown
Bozo and the Birds (Capitol, 1949)
The Grasshopper And The Ants (Capitol, 1949) as The Grasshopper
Bozo on The Farm (Capitol, 1950) as Bozo the Clown
Bozo Has A Party (Capitol, 1952) as Bozo the Clown
Mickey Mouse's Candy Mine (RCA, 1952) as Goofy
Bozo At The Dog Show (Capitol, 1954) as Bozo the Clown
Bozo's Merry-Go-Round Music (Capitol, 1954) as Bozo the Clown
Mickey Mouse's Birthday Party (Capitol, 1954) as Goofy, Pluto, Grumpy, Practical Pig, Cleo
Walt Disney's Song Parade from Disneyland (Golden, 1956) as Goofy
Mickey and the Beanstalk (Disneyland, 1963) as Goofy
Goofy's TV Spectacular (Disneyland, 1964) as Goofy
Children's Riddles and Game Songs (Disneyland, 1964) as Goofy (speaking voice only)

References

External links 
 

1892 births
1967 deaths
20th-century American male actors
American cartoonists
American circus performers
American male radio actors
American male voice actors
Animators from California
Bozo the Clown
Burials at Holy Cross Cemetery, Culver City
Deaths from lung cancer in California
Fleischer Studios people
Metro-Goldwyn-Mayer cartoon studio people
Oregon State University alumni
People from Jacksonville, Oregon
Vaudeville performers
Walt Disney Animation Studios people
Walter Lantz Productions people
Warner Bros. Cartoons voice actors
Animal impersonators